Stanislav Aleksandrovich Kovalev (born 17 October 1991) is a Russian former competitive figure skater. At the 2009 World Junior Championships, he advanced to the final segment and finished 16th overall. The following season, he won medals at ISU Junior Grand Prix (JGP) events in Belarus and Turkey, resulting in qualification to the 2009 JGP Final in Tokyo, Japan.

Kovalev trained under Zhanna Gromova until 2010. He then switched to Viktor Kudriavtsev.

Programs

Competitive highlights 
JGP: Junior Grand Prix

References

External links 
 

1991 births
Russian male single skaters
Living people
Figure skaters from Moscow